The Genus Panstrongylus Berg, 1879 belongs to the subfamily Triatominae.

Species
Panstrongylus chinai (Del Ponte, 1929) (Tc)
Panstrongylus diasi Pinto & Lent, 1946
Panstrongylus geniculatus (Latreille 1811)  (Tc)
Panstrongylus guentheri Berg, 1879  (Tc)
Panstrongylus howardi (Neiva, 1911)  (Tc)
Panstrongylus humeralis (Usinger, 1939)  (Tc)
Panstrongylus lenti Galvão & Palma, 1968
Panstrongylus lignarius (Walker, 1873)  (Tc)
Panstrongylus lutzi (Neiva & Pinto, 1923b) (Tc)
Panstrongylus megistus (Burmeister, 1835) (Tc)
Panstrongylus mitarakaensis (Bérenger & Blanchet, 2007)
Panstrongylus rufotuberculatus (Champion, 1899)  (Tc)
Panstrongylus tupynambai Lent, 1942  (Tc)

(Tc) means associated with Trypanosoma cruzi

Reduviidae